The men's 400 metres event at the 1991 Summer Universiade was held at the Don Valley Stadium in Sheffield on 20, 21 and 22 July 1991.

Medalists

Results

Heats
Held on 20 July

Quarterfinals
Held on 20 July

Semifinals
Held on 21 July

Final
Held on 22 July

References

Athletics at the 1991 Summer Universiade
1991